Darko Miličić (born June 20, 1985) is a Serbian former professional basketball player. Miličić played in the National Basketball Association (NBA) from 2003 to 2013. He is the fifth youngest player and the youngest foreign player to have played in the NBA and is the youngest player to have played in an NBA Finals game, and the youngest player to win the NBA championship.

Miličić was selected by the Detroit Pistons as the second overall pick in the 2003 NBA draft; he was chosen after number one pick LeBron James and ahead of other future NBA stars including Carmelo Anthony, Chris Bosh and Dwyane Wade. Despite being selected with a high draft pick, Miličić failed to play at the level expected of him in the NBA and is widely regarded as a draft bust. While he won an NBA championship with the Pistons in 2004, Miličić never received significant playing time during his  seasons with the team and was traded to the Orlando Magic in 2006. Following stints with the Magic, the Memphis Grizzlies, and the New York Knicks, Miličić was traded to the Minnesota Timberwolves in 2010 and signed a four-year contract with the team that summer. After being released by Minnesota in 2012, he played one regular-season game for the Boston Celtics later that year before being released. Miličić announced his retirement from the NBA in June 2013; he retired with career averages of 6.0 points and 4.2 rebounds per game.

In international play, Miličić played for the Serbian national team.

Early life
Miličić's parents are Milorad and Zora. During the Yugoslav Wars, when Miličić was not yet 10, he heard a news report in which his father was named as one of several Serbian soldiers killed in action; however, a few minutes later, the newscaster indicated some of the soldiers, including his father, had been incorrectly included as killed. His father ultimately survived the wars. His parents' families hail from Janj near Šipovo in Bosanska Krajina. His sister Tijana is a volleyball player.

Miličić played his first youth basketball in BFC Beočin until NATO bombing of Yugoslavia that lasted from 24 March 1999 to 10 June 1999, when he was forced to take a break. After that, he played for the basketball club Sports World from Novi Sad, which is also a basketball school, where he became a dominant figure and received interest from bigger teams.

At the age of 14, Miličić started playing basketball with the Serbian team Hemofarm's junior team. He was later called up from the junior team before being drafted by the NBA's Detroit Pistons in 2003.

NBA career

Detroit Pistons (2003–2006)

The Detroit Pistons chose Miličić with the second overall pick in the 2003 NBA draft. Unlike most teams with high draft choices, the Pistons were a good team that had made the Eastern Conference Finals the season before they drafted Miličić. The NBA draft rules had to be changed to allow Miličić to be drafted. The Pistons held the second overall draft pick because of a 1997 trade that had sent Otis Thorpe to the Vancouver Grizzlies. Miličić saw limited playing time during his first season with the Pistons, but did become the youngest player to appear in an NBA Finals game (18 years and 356 days) and won an NBA championship just five days later when the Pistons defeated the Los Angeles Lakers in the 2004 NBA Finals.

Pistons team president Joe Dumars repeatedly stated that Miličić would play a big part in the team's future, but he did not see a large increase in playing time during his second season. Miličić has been quoted on numerous occasions as attributing his slow development on his lack of playing time; "I've said it 10,000 times, the best way for me to improve is to play. All the work in practice and individual workouts can only help me so much".

After Larry Brown's departure, Flip Saunders was hired as head coach of the Pistons. Under Saunders, Miličić still averaged only 5.6 minutes per game, and received significant playing time only in blowout wins or blowout losses for the Pistons. Miličić's lack of playing time in Detroit was frequently highlighted in publications. In the 96 games he played as a Piston, he only scored a total of 152 points and averaged 1.6 points and 5.8 minutes per game.

Orlando Magic (2006–2007)
On February 15, 2006, just prior to the NBA's All-Star break, Miličić was traded, along with point guard Carlos Arroyo, to the Orlando Magic for Kelvin Cato and a first-round pick in the 2007 NBA draft (Rodney Stuckey).

During a game against the New York Knicks he played 32 minutes and finished with 13 points and seven rebounds. The 13 points and 32 minutes were season highs, and he led the Magic in minutes for that game. Miličić averaged 2.4 blocks per game in his first 20 games as a member of the Magic. In the 2006–07 playoffs, he increased his scoring by four points per game to 12.3 on 58.8% shooting. When his rookie contract expired in the 2007 offseason, Orlando made him a qualifying offer; on July 3, 2007, however, the team withdrew that offer and made Milicic an unrestricted free agent.

Memphis Grizzlies (2007–2009)

On July 12, 2007, the first day of free agency, Miličić was signed by the Memphis Grizzlies to a three-year, $21 million contract. Miličić hurt his Achilles tendon practicing with the Serbian national team in the 2008 offseason but was available to start at the beginning of the season. Miličić began the 2008–09 season starting at power forward but, due to poor play, was moved to the bench. Miličić regained his starting job as his play steadily improved in early December 2008. Miličić's progress was set back by an injury on December 26, 2008 against the Indiana Pacers when he broke a knuckle on his right hand during the game.

Miličić's time with the Grizzlies was one of the low points of his career; he did not want to play for the team, he suffered an injury, and the team was not performing well. His wife would recall that he would punch the walls of his house in anger after coming home from games. During a game against the Houston Rockets in early December 2008, he even deliberately ripped his jersey in frustration (the jersey was later autographed by him and sold at an auction).

New York Knicks (2009–2010)
On June 25, 2009, Miličić was traded to the New York Knicks for Quentin Richardson and cash considerations. On December 17, 2009, Miličić said that he planned to leave the NBA and return to playing basketball in Europe the following season.

Minnesota Timberwolves (2010–2012)
On February 17, 2010, Miličić was traded to the Minnesota Timberwolves along with cash considerations for Brian Cardinal. The Timberwolves agreed to re-sign Milicic for four years and $20 million on July 1, 2010. David Kahn said that Darko was "like manna from heaven." The 2010–11 Minnesota season was Milicic's best statistically; in interviews, he looked back on that time period fondly relative to the rest of his time in the NBA. He averaged 8.8 points, 5.2 rebounds, and 2.0 blocks per game, finishing the season fifth in the league in blocks per game. Miličić had his best games on November 19, when he scored 23 points, 16 rebounds and six blocks against the Los Angeles Lakers; and on December 14, 2010, when he had a career-high 25 points and 11 rebounds against the Golden State Warriors.

Miličić began the 2011-12 season as the Timberwolves' starting center. On January 20, 2012, he scored a season-high 22 points and seven rebounds against the Los Angeles Clippers. However, he would see his playing time diminish as the season went on. On July 12, 2012, Miličić was waived by the Timberwolves under the league's amnesty clause.

Boston Celtics (2012)
In September 2012, Miličić signed with the Boston Celtics. On November 21, 2012, the Celtics released Miličić at his request so that he could attend to personal matters. Miličić' final game ever was on November 2nd, 2012 in a 88 - 99 loss to the Milwaukee Bucks where he recorded 1 rebound, 2 turnovers and 1 foul. This was the Celtic's 2nd game of the season and it was the only game that Miličić played during the entire season, playing only five minutes for that game.

In June 2013, Miličić announced that he had retired from the NBA. He retired with career averages of 6.0 points and 4.2 rebounds per game. In September 2014, it was revealed that Miličić had retired from professional basketball in order to pursue a kickboxing career.

Legacy 
As of February 2023, Miličić is the fifth youngest player to have played in the NBA. As of February 2023, he is also the youngest foreign player to have played in the NBA, the youngest player to have played in an NBA Finals game, and the youngest NBA champion. After having been selected with the second overall pick in the 2003 NBA Draft, Miličić failed to play at the level expected of him in the NBA and is known as one of the worst draft choices in the history of the NBA. Miličić himself has questioned whether the Pistons made the right move by drafting him. The Detroit Pistons passed over future NBA stars Carmelo Anthony, Chris Bosh, and Dwyane Wade to select Miličić. In June 2011, Mark David Smith of Bleacher Report wrote, "The Pistons missed a huge opportunity when they picked Darko. Carmelo, Wade or Bosh could’ve helped put Detroit over the hump after the 2004 championship season. The thought of one of these superstars with that Pistons team is scary; it could’ve potentially made them one of the best dynasties in all of sports history".

International basketball career
Miličić played for the FR Yugoslavia U16 national team that won a gold medal at the European Cadet Championships in 2001.

In 2006, Miličić led Serbia and Montenegro at the 2006 FIBA World Championship. Serbia and Montenegro had decided to replace their aging superstars—who had led the team to a gold medal finish in the previous 2002 FIBA World Championship—with young blood. Miličić led the team in rebounds (56) and blocked shots (17) and was second on the team in scoring (16.2 ppg) and assists (11) through six games. In Serbia and Montenegro's sixth and final game against Spain, Miličić matched up against NBA All-Star Pau Gasol and finished with 18 points, 15 rebounds, and three blocks.

During an interview following a 68–67 overtime loss to Greece at EuroBasket 2007, Miličić made vulgar remarks to the media in his native language. He referred to the referees with expletives and threatened to engage in various sex acts with their female relatives. He received a $13,770 fine from FIBA and his outburst was heavily criticized by Memphis Grizzlies general manager Chris Wallace and head coach Marc Iavaroni.

Post-NBA activities

Kickboxing career 
Miličić had a stint in kickboxing during 2014. On December 18, 2014, he had his official debut in kickboxing under the WAKO rules in his hometown Novi Sad. He lost that fight by 2nd round TKO from Serbian kickboxer Radovan Radojčin from Senta, Serbia.

Attempt to return from retirement 
On 19 May 2015, it was announced that Miličić had agreed to come back from retirement and start playing professional basketball again with Metalac Farmakom of the Basketball League of Serbia and the ABA League after the season was over. The announcement was made by Boško Đukanović, the club's president, and later confirmed by Miličić himself. However, Miličić later changed his mind.

Farming 
Miličić works as a farmer in his native Serbia.

Amateur basketball career 
In September 2019, Miličić joined I Came to Play in his hometown of Novi Sad. He debuted with the team on 6 October in a 78–50 victory against KK Futog, scoring two points and handing out several assists before leaving the game with a minor shoulder injury.

Personal life
On May 23, 2009, Miličić married Zorana Markuš. They have a daughter and two sons. His wife is a fashion designer and sister of deceased Serbian criminal Marko Markuš.

In 2010, Miličić paid for a trip and treatment in China for five Serbian children suffering from Batten disease.

Miličić is a supporter of the Ravna Gora movement (Ravnogorski pokret), and has tattoos of World War II Chetnik leaders Nikola Kalabić and Momčilo Đujić on his stomach, and Draža Mihailović and Brane Bogunović on his back. In late 2013, he expressed his support for far-right politician and convicted war criminal Vojislav Šešelj.

A folk song was made in his honour by the Bosnian Serb duo Žare i Goci.

Career statistics

Regular season 

|-
|style="text-align:left;background:#afe6ba;"| †
| align="left" | Detroit
| 34 || 0 || 4.7 || .262 || .000 || .583 || 1.3 || .2 || .2 || .4 || 1.4
|-
| align="left" | 
| align="left" | Detroit
| 37 || 2 || 6.9 || .329 || .000 || .708 || 1.2 || .2 || .1 || .5 || 1.8
|-
| align="left" | 
| align="left" | Detroit
| 25 || 0 || 5.6 || .515 || .000 || .375 || 1.1 || .4 || .1 || .6 || 1.5
|-
| align="left" | 
| align="left" | Orlando
| 30 || 1 || 20.9 || .507 || .000 || .595 || 4.1 || 1.1 || .4 || 2.1 || 7.6
|-
| align="left" | 
| align="left" | Orlando
| 80 || 16 || 23.9 || .454 || .000 || .613 || 5.5 || 1.1 || .6 || 1.8 || 8.0
|-
| align="left" | 
| align="left" | Memphis
| 70 || 64 || 23.8 || .438 || .000 || .554 || 6.1 || .8 || .5 || 1.6 || 7.2
|-
| align="left" | 
| align="left" | Memphis
| 61 || 15 || 17.0 || .515 || .000 || .562 || 4.3 || .6 || .4 || .8 || 5.5
|-
| align="left" | 
| align="left" | New York
| 8 || 0 || 8.9 || .471 || .000 || .000 || 2.3 || .5 || .5 || .1 || 2.0
|-
| align="left" | 
| align="left" | Minnesota
| 24 || 18 || 25.6 || .492 || .000 || .536 || 5.5 || 1.8 || .8 || 1.4 || 8.3
|-
| align="left" | 
| align="left" | Minnesota
| 69 || 69 || 24.4 || .469 || .000 || .557 || 5.2 || 1.5 || .8 || 2.0 || 8.8
|-
| align="left" | 
| align="left" | Minnesota
| 29 || 23 || 16.3 || .454 || .000 || .432 || 3.3 || .6 || .3 || .9 || 4.6
|-
| align="left" | 
| align="left" | Boston
| 1 || 0 || 5.0 || .000 || .000 || .000 || 1.0 || .0 || .0 || .0 || .0
|- class="sortbottom"
| style="text-align:center;" colspan="2"| Career
| 468 || 208 || 18.5 || .460 || .000 || .574 || 4.2 || .9 || .4 || 1.3 || 6.0

Playoffs 

|-
|style="text-align:left;background:#afe6ba;"| 2004†
| align="left" | Detroit
| 8 || 0 || 1.8 || .000 || .000 || .250 || .4 || .1 || .1 || .0 || .1
|-
| align="left" | 2005
| align="left" | Detroit
| 9 || 0 || 2.3 || .286 || .000 || 1.000 || .4 || .1 || .0 || .1 || .6
|-
| align="left" | 2007
| align="left" | Orlando
| 4 || 0 || 28.8 || .588 || .000 || .529 || 4.5 || 1.0 || .3 || 1.0 || 12.3
|- class="sortbottom"
| style="text-align:center;" colspan="2"| Career
| 21 || 0 || 7.1 || .489 || .000 || .500 || 1.2 || .3 || .1 || .2 || 2.6

Kickboxing record

|- bgcolor="FFBBBB"
| 2014-12-18 || Loss ||align=left| Radovan Radojčin || SOUL Night of Champions|| Novi Sad, Serbia || TKO (Cut) || 2 || || 0–1
|-
! style=background:white colspan=9 |
|-
| colspan=9 |Legend:

See also

 List of European basketball players in the United States
 List of oldest and youngest National Basketball Association players
 List of Serbian NBA players

References

External links

 
 Darko Miličić at draftexpress.com
 Darko Miličić at espn.com
 
 Darko Miličić at nba.com (Prospect Profile)

1985 births
Living people
2006 FIBA World Championship players
Boston Celtics players
Centers (basketball)
Detroit Pistons draft picks
Detroit Pistons players
KK BFC players
KK Hemofarm players
Members of the Assembly of KK Crvena zvezda
Memphis Grizzlies players
Minnesota Timberwolves players
National Basketball Association players from Serbia
New York Knicks players
I Came to Play players
Orlando Magic players
Power forwards (basketball)
Serbia men's national basketball team players
Serbian expatriate basketball people in the United States
Serbian farmers
Serbian male kickboxers
Serbian men's basketball players
Serbian people of Bosnia and Herzegovina descent
Basketball players from Novi Sad
Heavyweight kickboxers